North West Regional College is a further education and higher education college in the north-west region of Northern Ireland. The college has five main campuses in counties Londonderry and Tyrone: Strand Road (Derry), Springtown (Derry), Main Street (Limavady), Greystone (Limavady) and Derry Road (Strabane).

Following a review of further education in Northern Ireland Department for Employment and Learning, North West Regional College was established on 1 August 2007, merging the former North West Institute of Further and Higher Education and Limavady College of Further and Higher Education.

Over the last 100 years, the college and its preceding organisations have provided educational courses both to school leavers and adults principally from Derry City, County Londonderry, County Tyrone and County Donegal.

Each year approximately 25,000 full-time and part-time students attend the college to undertake a range of vocational and academic courses.

The current principal of the college is Leo Murphy.

References

External links
North West Regional College official website

Education in Derry (city)
Further education colleges in Northern Ireland
Higher education colleges in Northern Ireland
Education in County Londonderry
Education in County Tyrone
Educational institutions established in 2007
Limavady
Strabane
2007 establishments in Northern Ireland